George Marshall Parker Jr. (April 17, 1889 – October 23, 1968) was an officer of the United States Army with the rank of major general.  General Parker commanded the Philippine II Corps during the Battle of Bataan.

Biography
Parker was born and raised in Iowa and was commissioned a 2nd lieutenant of Infantry in the U.S. Army in 1910.  He rose to the rank of major during World War I.  Parker was a distinguished graduate of the Command and General Staff School in 1923 and graduated from the Army War College in 1925.  He was promoted to lieutenant colonel in October 1934 and to colonel in January 1939.

Parker was assigned to the Philippines shortly before the Japanese invasion and was promoted to brigadier general in April 1941.

World War II
On November 4, 1941, shortly before the Japanese invasion of the Philippines, Parker was assigned the command of the Southern Luzon Force (SLF), which consisted of the 41st Division, 51st Division and the Battery A of 86th Field Artillery Regiment of the Philippine Scouts.  The 41st Division was centered around Nasugbu, Batangas and Tagaytay Ridge to meet any landings by the Japanese on the western shores of Southern Luzon, while the 51st was assigned on the eastern shores of in the event the Japanese would land in the vicinity of Lamon Bay.

On December 23, two weeks after the Japanese landings, the SLF was ordered to Bataan as General Douglas MacArthur activated War Plan Orange.  On December 24 Parker was appointed commander of the Bataan Defense Force (BDF) and promoted to major general.  On January 6, 1942, the BDF was converted to the Philippines II Corps, during the Battle of Bataan.

Parker surrendered the II Philippine Corps on April 9, 1942 and was a prisoner of war until the Japanese surrender in August 1945.  He was one of 18 American Army generals captured in the Philippines.

General Parker retired from the Army on September 30, 1946.  He moved to Oregon and died at a nursing home in Portland. He was interred at the Mount Crest Abbey Mausoleum in Salem, Oregon on October 25, 1968.

Decorations

Dates of rank

Source: U.S. Army Register, 1948.

References

External links
Generals of World War II

1889 births
1968 deaths
People from Sac City, Iowa
United States Army Infantry Branch personnel
Military personnel from Iowa
United States Army personnel of World War I
United States Army Command and General Staff College alumni
United States Army War College alumni
United States Army generals of World War II
American prisoners of war in World War II
World War II prisoners of war held by Japan
Bataan Death March prisoners
Recipients of the Distinguished Service Medal (US Army)
United States Army generals
People from Portland, Oregon